Ulva Island (from ) is a small island about  long lying within Paterson Inlet, which is part of Stewart Island/Rakiura in New Zealand. It was named after the island of Ulva in the Inner Hebrides of Scotland and was formerly called Coopers Island.

Ulva Island's relative isolation, but easy access from Stewart Island has allowed it to become an important natural resource area. It is a sanctuary for both birds and plants, holding species that on the mainland of New Zealand are rare or have died out.  In 1997, the island was declared rat-free, following an eradication programme, and extirpated birds have been reintroduced to the island. The birds include the South Island saddleback (tieke), yellowhead (mohua) and Stewart Island robin.  Other birds on the island that are rare on the mainland include the Stewart Island subspecies of southern brown kiwi (tokoeka), rifleman (tititipounamu), yellow-crowned and red-fronted parakeet, and South Island kaka or forest parrot, as well as several other species. The endangered yellow-eyed penguin uses the island for breeding sites.

There have been more than 20 rat incursions detected between 1997 and 2022. The gestation period of Norway rats is 3 weeks, so a population can build up quickly. In 2022, the Department of Conservation announced that a rat incursion in February had not been successfully contained, and that rats had spread to other parts of the island, posing a significant threat to the most vulnerable species on the island. The Predator Free Rakiura trust commented that the discovery of rats on Ulva Island provided support for the need to eradicate predators on mainland Rakiura.

The Department of Conservation currently maintains the public portion of the island including its predator free status.

See also

 List of islands of New Zealand
 List of islands
 Desert island

References

External links 

Ulva Island Open Sanctuary at the Department of Conservation

Uninhabited islands of New Zealand
Islands of Southland, New Zealand
Stewart Island
Island restoration